Gayathri Varsha is an Indian actress best known for her work in Malayalam cinema and television serials. She is most popular for the role of Sarasu in the 2002 movie Meesa Madhavan.

Acting career
Gayathri is an actress popular from her role in Meesa Madhavan and she appeared in many television serials and has acted in numerous Malayalam movies and serials mainly in supporting roles.

Filmography

Television career

Acting credits
Telefilms
 Nanmayude Nakshathrangal (Kairali TV) 
 Monoottante Onam (Surya TV)

TV serials

Anchor
 Sthreeparvam
 Ente Koottu
 Veettamma
 Thararuchi
 Akathalam

Contestant/Participant
 Smart Show
 Onaradham
 Snehitha
 Comedy Sthreekal
 Celebrity Budget
 Shubharathri
 Nammal Thammil
 Thara Raja Thara Rani
 Tharotsavam
 Annie's Kitchen
 Humorous Talk Show

References

External links
 

Living people
Indian film actresses
Actresses in Malayalam cinema
Actresses from Kerala
20th-century Indian actresses
21st-century Indian actresses
Year of birth missing (living people)
Actresses in Malayalam television